Karihi is a brother or cousin of Tāwhaki in Māori mythology.

They tricked the  into entering a house, and then locked them in, claiming there was still time before the dawn. They then opened the door after the sun was up, the  died at the exposure to sunlight.

According to the Ngāi Tahu account, Karihi died when, in his attempt to climb to heaven, he was blown away by the wind of Uru-Tonga. In some versions, Tāwhaki then took the eyes of his younger brother Karihi to their blind grandmother Matakerepo Whaitiri.

According to the Ngāi Tūhoe account of this attempted climb toward heaven Karihi survived.

References 

Legendary Māori people